Ifanes is a former parish in the municipality of Miranda do Douro, Portugal. The population in 2011 was 160, in an area of 28.51 km2. In 2013, the parish merged with Paradela to form the new parish Ifanes e Paradela.

References

Former parishes of Miranda do Douro
Populated places disestablished in 2013
2013 disestablishments in Portugal